Nikola Tomić (also known as Nykk Deetronic, born February 19. 1975, Kragujevac) is a Serbian composer, multimedia designer, animator and web designer. He is author of popular animated cartoons for children We are chickens (Serbian: Mi smo pilići), Mommy Loves Baby (Serbian: Mama voli bebu) and Maxim's adventures (Serbian: Maksimove avanture). His YouTube channel is among the most visited channels in the countries of former Yugoslavia. As of August 2018, he has almost 1 million subscribers and over 1 billion video views.

YouTube channel
Tomić created his YouTube channel in 2007 as a personal portfolio. Channel remained relatively anonymous until 2011, and the only video from that period with significant viewcount was the Nyan Pig. Tomić's YouTube channel started to be recognized by wider audience when he published the first version of We are chickens video.

We are chickens
Tomić was a member of team engaged on development of Facebook game Chicken lines (Serbian: Pilići), authored by Nenad Hrnjak. Tomić made a theme music for Serbian version of the game, while the English theme was composed by Boris Mladenović from the Jarboli band.

In 2011 Tomić published on his YouTube channel animated video We are chickens, for which he composed music and made animation, while the characters were designed by his cousin Dragan Tomić. Video become viral and significantly contributed to popularity of tomic's channel.

Maxim's adventures
Maxim's adventures (Serbian: Maksimove avanture) is a series of animated cartoons published first on Tomić's YouTube channel, and broadcast from September 10, 2016. on the first channel of Radio Television of Serbia.

Main characters are family members – daddy, mommy, and a little boy Maxim and their pet, a little dog called Masha. Characters are based on Tomić's own family members. Several theater plays based on Maxim's adventures were produced.

Mommy loves baby
Children's song Mommy loves baby (Serbian: Mama voli bebu) is Tomić's the most popular YouTube video with over 160 million views (July 2018). The song was made by chance, when Tomić's spouse Jelena sang a song to their son Maxim. Tomić recorded a song with his smartphone and in 2013. published a video. The song was sung by Jelena Kovačević. Later on, the song was adopted on Bosnian, Chinese, Italian and Spanish languages.

Brand
Mommy loves baby & Maxim's adventures is a brand and franchise used by Tomić for placement of products and services on the market, a business model already used by similar brands such as Masha and the Bear or Angry Birds.

 In 2016 Tomić and AdvanTec Group from Belgrade placed on the market puppets modelled after characters of daddy, mommy and Maxim.
 In 2017 a number of books was published in the serie Growing up with Maxim (Serbian: Odrastanje sa Maksimom):
 Adventure in the ZOO (Serbian: Avantura u zoo vrtu) 
 The first day in the kindergarten (Serbian: Prvi dan u vrtiću) 
 But I'm afraid (Serbian: Ali ja se bojim) 
 No no no and no (Serbian: Ne ne ne i ne) 
 Adventure with letters (Serbian: Avantura sa slovima) 
 I'm bored (Serbian: Dosadno mi je) 
 Healthy snack (Serbian: Zdrava užina) 
 That really isn't fair (Serbian: To stvarno nije fer) 
 In 2017 a kindergarten named Maksimove avanture was opened in Belgrade, Serbia.

Controversy and legal issues
Tomić's YouTube channel already survived several legal attacks, based on copyright infringement and intellectual property, which caused temporary removal of Tomić's videos from YouTube on multiple occasions.

After We are chickens video, Tomić produced and published additional videos with the same characters, which in 2015 caused legal disagreements and copyright issues between Tomić, Nenad Hrnjak (author of Facebook game Chicken lines) and IDJVideos ltd. Tomić, Hrnjak i IDJVideos solved this problem in the manner that Tomić removed 7 controversial videos with Chickens from his channel, while Hrnjak in turn granted Tomić with free licence for Chickens usage in the remaining 11 videos.

In June 2017, Tomić's YouTube channel was attacked once again, this time by Advantec Group ltd. from Belgrade, with whom Tomić already had some previous business cooperation in toys distribution. On May 30, 2017 Advantec Group submitted a registration claim on Mama voli bebu – Maksimove avanture trademark. As a consequence, the Court in Serbia rendered a decision on preliminary injunction by which Nikola Tomić is forbidden to make publicly available all episodes of Maksim's adventures until the dispute is resolved in final instance.

References

External links
 Mommy Loves Baby
 Deetronic Design Studio
 Nykk Deetronic YouTube channel
 Official facebook page

Living people
1975 births
Musicians from Kragujevac
Serbian composers
Serbian animators
Serbian designers